The Chile women's national football team has represented Chile at the FIFA Women's World Cup at one staging of the tournament, in 2019.

FIFA Women's World Cup record

Record by opponent

2019 FIFA Women's World Cup

Group F

Goalscorers

References

 
Countries at the FIFA Women's World Cup